Cannabis in Eswatini (Swaziland) is illegal; the herb is referred to as insangu in Swazi. The local strain is known as "Swazi gold" and commands a high price due to its reputation for potency.

Trade
Cannabis is widely grown illicitly in Swaziland; a 2006 UNODC report recognized Swaziland as one of the major producers in Southern Africa. Nigerian criminal syndicates are involved in the trade, with the best-quality cannabis being sent to Europe via South Africa and Mozambique.

Reform
In 2017, a group of Members of Parliament announced that legalizing cannabis in Swaziland could add US$1.63 billion to the economy, potentially tripling the Gross Domestic Product.

References

Eswatini
Drugs in Eswatini